Sokoa Azkarate is a Spanish former football goalkeeper who played mainly for Real Sociedad in the Spanish First Division, where she competed for the position with the younger Cris Cornejo until retiring in 2014 aged 35. Prior to playing football, she was a basketball player for five years.

References

External links
Profile at Txapeldunak.com 

1979 births
Living people
Spanish women's footballers
Footballers from the Basque Country (autonomous community)
Primera División (women) players
Women's association football goalkeepers
Real Sociedad (women) players
People from Mondragón
Sportspeople from Gipuzkoa